Petar "Pera" Dobrinović (1853–1923) was a Serbian actor and director at the Serbian National Theatre in Novi Sad.

References

Sources

19th-century Serbian actors
20th-century Serbian actors
Serbian male stage actors
Serbian theatre directors
Male actors from Belgrade
People from the Principality of Serbia
People from the Kingdom of Serbia
1853 births
1923 deaths
20th-century Serbian male actors
19th-century male actors
Theatre people from Belgrade